The Cordell Formation is a geologic formation in Michigan. It preserves fossils dating back to the Silurian period.

References

 

Silurian Michigan
Silurian southern paleotropical deposits